was a Japanese actress and voice actress. During her life, she was attached to Tokyo Actor's Consumer's Cooperative Society and Mix Max; she was attached to Aoni Production at the time of her death. On 18 February 2013, Honda died of multiple forms of cancer while undergoing treatment.

Filmography

Television animation
Heavy Metal L-Gaim (1984) (Amu Fanneria)
Dragon Ball (1986) (Pochawompa)
Mobile Suit Gundam ZZ (1986) (Elpeo Ple, Ple Two)
Kimagure Orange Road (1987) (Kurumi Kasuga)
Kyatto Ninden Teyandee (1991) (Okara)
YuYu Hakusho (1992) (Misako)
Floral Magician Mary Bell (1992) (Mary Bell)
Sailor Moon S (1994) (Tellu)
Akazukin Chacha (1994) (Teacher Mayachon)
Cho Kuse ni Nariso (1994) (Momoko)
Nurse Angel Ririka SOS (1995) (Ms. Kimizuka)
Wedding Peach (1995) (Noiizu)
After War Gundam X (1996) (Ennil El)
Rurouni Kenshin (1996) (Azusa)
Flame of Recca (1997) (Mikoto)
Shōjo Kakumei Utena (1997) (Kozue Kaoru)
Cyber Team in Akihabara (1998) (Jun Goutokuji/Blood Falcon)
Full Moon o Sagashite (2002) (Meroko Yui)
Mermaid Forest (2003) (Yukie)
Mermaid Melody Pichi Pichi Pitch (2003) (Yūri)
Pocket Monsters Diamond & Pearl (2007) (Gardenia)
Soul Eater (2008) (Marie Mjolnir)

Unknown date

Bosco Adventure (Araiguma)
Corrector Yui (Manami Sayama)
Detective Conan (Akane Isaka, Akiko Sayama, Kinoshita (young))
Doteraman (Yukari)
Ganbare, Kickers! (Ayumi Daichi)
Grenadier - The Senshi of Smiles (Tenshi)
Himitsu no Akko-chan (Tsukiko Takeno)
Jigoku Sensei Nūbē (Izuna Hazuki)
Katekyo Hitman Reborn! (Yoka Iris)
Kiteretsu Daihyakka (Miyoko Nonoka, Omiyo)
Lady Lady!! (Sarah Frances Russell)
Let's Ask Dr. Rin! (Azusa)
Mobile Suit Gundam: The 08th MS Team (Cynthia)
Oh My Goddess! (Chieko Honda)
Penguin Musume Heart (Black Rose)
Rosario + Vampire Capu2 (Ageha Kurono)
Soreike! Anpanman (Tsurarachan)
Robin Hood no Daiboken (Cleo)
The Burning Wild Man (Yukie Kokuhō)
The Legend of Snow White (Cathy)
Time Travel Tondekeman (Tanya)
To Heart 2 (Haruka Yuzuhara)
Yagami-kun's Family Affairs (Nomi Yagami)

Original video animation
Gall Force (1986) (Amy)
Dead Heat (1987) (Kaori)
Battle Royal High School (1987) (Kei Kobayashi)
Dragon Century (1988) (Rulishia)
Hades Project Zeorymer (1988) (Miku Himuro)
Violence Jack Evil Town (1988) (Tom Cat)
Riding Bean (1989) (Chelsea)
Devil Hunter Yohko (1990) (Chikako Ogawa)
1+2=Paradise (1990) (Rika Nakamura)
Yagami-kun no Katei no Jijō (1990) (Nomi Yagami)
Here is Greenwood (1991) (Miya Igarashi)
Madara (1991) (Kirin)
Black Jack (1993) (Romi)
Compiler (1994) (Plasma)
Tekkaman Blade II (1994) (Natasha Pablochiva/Tekkaman Vesna)

Theatrical animation
Mobile Suit SD Gundam (1988) (Elpeo Ple)
Silent Möbius (1991) (Nami Yamigumo)
Kochira Katsushika-ku Kameari Kōen-mae Hashutsujo: The Movie 2: UFO Shūrai! Tornado Daisakusen!! (2003) (Cathy)
Detective Conan: The Lost Ship in the Sky (2010) (Chiaki Ōta)

Video games
Jigoku Sensei Nūbē (1997) (Izuna Hazuki)
EVE ZERO (2000) (Yayoi Katsuragi)
EVE New Generation (2006) (Yayoi Katsuragi)
Wrestle Angels Survivor (2006) (Hikaru Ogawa, Shizuka Yajima)
Vanquish (2010) (Elena Ivanova)
Pachislot To Heart 2 (2012) (Haruka Yuzuhara)

Dubbing roles

Animation
The Legend of Tarzan (Queen La)

References

External links
 
 

1963 births
2013 deaths
Aoni Production voice actors
Deaths from cancer in Japan
Japanese video game actresses
Japanese voice actresses
Place of death missing
Tokyo Actor's Consumer's Cooperative Society voice actors
Voice actresses from Tokyo